Bohemian National Cemetery is a cemetery at 5255 North Pulaski Road on the north side of Chicago, Illinois.

History

The cemetery was established by members of Chicago's Czech community in 1877. The community had been outraged when a Czech Catholic woman named Marie Silhanek was denied burial at several Catholic cemeteries in Chicago because she supposedly never made her Easter Duty (going to confession and Holy Communion at least once during the Easter season), which is incumbent on all Catholics, even today. In response, the Czechs purchased land in what was then Jefferson Township to create a cemetery that they themselves could control.

The cemetery was notably featured in the 1998 film U.S. Marshals. It was added to the National Register of Historic Places in 2006.

Major features

Bohemian National Cemetery is known for its limestone gatehouse and its highly decorated columbarium niches, which contain photographs, artwork, flags, and other mementos of the individuals whose ashes are stored there. Czech-American military veterans are honored through an American Civil War memorial, a Spanish–American War memorial, and a World Wars memorial, which were dedicated in 1889, 1926, and 1952, respectively. The cemetery also boasts two sculptures by Albin Polasek, who headed the sculpture department at the Art Institute of Chicago. They are called Mother and Pilgrim.

Notable interments
 Victims of the SS Eastland shipwreck (1915).
 Anton Cermak, Chicago mayor assassinated in 1933.
 Otto Kerner, Sr., (1952) judge and former Illinois Attorney General.
 Elsie Paroubek, (1911) a five-year-old kidnapping and murder victim whose story and photo in the Chicago Daily News inspired Henry Darger's novel The Story of the Vivian Girls.
 Charles J. Vopicka, (1935) U.S. ambassador to several eastern European countries.
 Wanda Stopa, (1924) Chicago's youngest and first woman assistant U.S. district attorney.

Chicago Cubs columbarium

In 2009, the cemetery added a columbarium specially dedicated to Chicago Cubs fans.  The structure is a replica of Wrigley Field's red brick wall, with a stained glass image of the stadium's scoreboard and a yellow 400 foot (120 m) marker. The wall contains 288 niches, and seats from Wrigley Field have been placed along its base. A Cubs fan named Dennis Mascari helped raise funds for the project in hopes of making visits to the cemetery less depressing. The cemetery agreed to let him build the columbarium on their grounds, but nixed a plan to broadcast Cubs games through a nearby speaker. The Cubs themselves were not directly involved with the project; Mascari worked with Eternal Images, which makes baseball-themed funerary products.

References

External links

 
 Friends of Bohemian National Cemetery
 
 Images of the cemetery at Graveyards.com

Cemeteries in Chicago
Czech-American history
Czech-American culture in Chicago
National Register of Historic Places in Chicago
Cemeteries on the National Register of Historic Places in Illinois
1877 establishments in Illinois
Chicago Cubs
North Park, Chicago